The men's 3 metre springboard, also reported as springboard diving, was one of four diving events on the diving at the 1948 Summer Olympics programme.

The competition, held on Friday 30 July and on Tuesday 3 August, was split into two sets of dives:

Compulsory dives
Divers performed five pre-chosen dives (one from each category) – a running straight header forward, backward header with pike, running straight isander-half gainer reverse dive, backward spring and forward dive with pike, and running straight forward twist. 
Facultative dives
Divers performed five dives of their choice (one from each category and different from the compulsory).

Twenty-seven divers from 16 nations competed. Eddie Heron of Ireland competed in the preliminary round but withdrew along with the rest of the Irish Amateur Swimming Association squad in protest at FINA's refusal to allow swimmers from Northern Ireland to compete for the team.

Results

References

Sources
  
 

Men
1948
Men's events at the 1948 Summer Olympics